The Bé River is a river of southern Vietnam. It flows through Bình Phước Province, Bình Dương Province and Đồng Nai Province for approximately 350 kilometres. It starts from Thác Mơ lake in Phước Long district of Bình Phước Province and empties to Đồng Nai River near Tri An Hydro Power Plant.

References

Rivers of Bình Dương province
Rivers of Bình Phước province
Rivers of Đồng Nai province
Rivers of Vietnam